The School District No. 1 in the City and County of Denver and State of Colorado, more commonly known as Denver Public Schools (DPS), is the public school system in the City and County of Denver, Colorado, United States.

History

In 1859, Owen J. Goldrick established the Union School, Denver's first school, a private school that served thirteen students. Other private schools opened shortly thereafter to accommodate Denver's rapidly growing population during the Pike's Peak Gold Rush. In 1861, the new territorial government established Goldrick as the superintendent in Arapahoe County (which then encompassed Denver). Soon after the first two public school districts in Denver were formed: District One on the east side of the city and District Two on the west side.  District Two opened the first public school in Denver on December 1, 1862 in a rented log cabin and District One followed suit soon after. On April 2, 1873 the first purpose built school building, the "Arapahoe School", opened.

In 1902, the 20th Amendment to the Constitution of the State of Colorado, known as the Rush Amendment, created the City and County of Denver, separating it from Arapahoe County. In 1903, Denver Public Schools was established. All school districts in Denver County were consolidated into Denver Public Schools, and Aaron Gove became the first-ever DPS Superintendent. Margaret Tupper True was president of the Denver School Board from 1906 to 1908, one of the first women to serve in such a role in a major city.

In 1994, Denver Public School teacher went on strike over classroom size, working conditions, and pay.

In 2015, the Brookings Institution ranked Denver Public Schools first in school choice among large school districts in the United States.

In 2018, Denver Public Schools joined other regional districts in banning its students from attending school-sanctioned trips to the Rocky Flats National Wildlife Refuge citing the history of the area's plutonium contamination and previous designation as a Superfund site.

In February 2019, teachers in the Denver Public Schools went on strike for three days as part of the larger wave of teachers' strikes across the United States that began in 2018. The teachers union, Denver Classroom Teachers Association (DCTA), demanded higher pay and school funding as well as a change to the teachers' compensation structure, which they said was overly reliant on bonuses instead of salary increases. It was the first strike in the district in 25 years. The deal that the union ultimately reached with the district kept some bonuses in place but also increased base salaries by 7 to 11 percent and created a new pay scale that puts more emphasis on teacher training and experience.

In 2020, all members of the board voted to remove police officers from schools in the wake of the murder of George Floyd.

Organization
DPS is the sole public school district in Denver.

DPS operates 207 schools, including traditional, magnet, charter and pathways schools, with a current total enrollment of about 90,250 students as of October 2021. Of those, 52.1% of the school district's enrollment is Hispanic, 25.3% is Caucasian, 13.7% is African American, 3% is Asian, 4% is two or more races, and 1% is American Indian. 140 languages are spoken, and 37% are English language learners. 11% of students have special needs. The poverty rate is 70%. 
 
Under the leadership of Superintendent Tom Boasberg and guided by the tenets of the Denver Plan, DPS had the second-highest academic growth in the nation. The total of DPS graduates has grown from 2,655 in 2006 to 3,608 in 2014. Drop-out rates have dropped from 11.1% in 2006 to 4.5% in 2014.

School Board
The Denver Board of Education is the policymaking body for DPS. The school board is made up of one representative from five districts and two at-large representatives, for a total of seven members. Dr. Carrie Olson was elected the school board president in 2019.

Student demographics

In the 2016-2017 school year, 92,331 students were enrolled in 207 Denver Public Schools consisting of 8 Early Childhood Education or K-12 schools, 92 elementary, 18 ECE-8 or K-8, 34 middle, 12 schools with grades 6-12, and 44 traditional high schools.

71.7 percent (62,977) of public school students qualified for free or reduced price lunch in the 2013-2014 school year.

There are 11,932 employees of DPS; 4,329 of them are teachers.

Race 
Although Denver is more than 52 percent non-Hispanic white, minority groups represent double the regular Denver population. The reason for this has been white flight over the past few decades and extremely strong Hispanic school-age growth due to relatively high birth rates. The predominant heritage in the Denver Public School system is Mexican American. Denver has a high Hispanic percentage of roughly 32%, and they are a majority in the public school system.

References

External links

Official district website
Official School Board BoardDocs

Education in Denver
School districts in Colorado
School districts established in 1902
1902 establishments in Colorado